The Hagerty House, also called the Hagerty-Harris House, is a two-story house located on 505 East Rusk Street in Marshall, Texas.  Built in 1889 by Thomas Higgins, it was the first solid brick residence in Marshall.  It was built for William Phillip Hagerty, personal engineer of Texas and Pacific Railroad president George J. Gould by railway craftsmen. Born in 1848 in Ireland during the Great Famine, Hagerty was likely to be arrested by the British government  due to his  nationalist activities when he emigrated in 1866 to the United States.
  
Members of the Hagerty family owned the house until 1967. Five years later, it was sold to the Harris family. Dr. James H. Harris and his son Dr. Rush C. Harris restored the house.

The house was made a Recorded Texas Historic Landmark and a historic marker was installed in 1977. It was also listed as a National Register of Historic Places the following year.

See also

National Register of Historic Places listings in Harrison County, Texas
Recorded Texas Historic Landmarks in Harrison County

References

External links

Hagerty-Harris Home from the Center for Regional Heritage Research, Stephen F. Austin State University

National Register of Historic Places in Harrison County, Texas
Greek Revival architecture in Texas
Houses completed in 1889
Harrison County, Texas